General Ángel Vicente Peñaloza is a department of the province of La Rioja (Argentina).

Settlements 
Alcázar
Carrizal
Chila
Punta de los Llanos
Tama
Tuizon

References 

Departments of La Rioja Province, Argentina